The 1972–73 Los Angeles Kings season was the Kings' sixth season in the National Hockey League. The team did not qualify for the playoffs and finished in sixth place out of eight teams in the West Division, only three points behind fourth place, the final playoff position. Kings' captain Bob Pulford retired from play before the season and took over as the Kings' head coach.

Offseason

Regular season
Bob Pulford became full-time head coach and instituted a disciplined defense oriented system. Consequently, the Kings allowed 60 fewer goals than in 1971–72. Their penalty killing, once the worst in the NHL, was led by Jimmy Peters and Real Lemieux and was the best in the league. Offensively, the Kings were led by "The Hot Line," which consisted of Juha Widing, Bob Berry, and Mike Corrigan; they combined for 89 goals and 112 assists.

After starting 1–6, the Kings went on a club record 8-game winning streak. But from early January through February, they endured a 4–13–5 stretch that saw them fall from 4th to 7th place. They got hot again in March, going 6–4–2 to get within 2 points of the 4th place St. Louis Blues, who held the final playoff spot with 3 games to play. But L.A. suffered two straight disastrous losses to the last place California Golden Seals, and fell to 6th, missing the playoffs by 3 points.

Final standings

Schedule and results

Playoffs
Did not qualify

Player statistics

Awards and records
None

Transactions
The Kings were involved in the following transactions during the 1972–73 season.

Trades

Free agent signings

Free agents lost

Reverse Draft

Intra-league Draft

Expansion Draft

Draft picks
Los Angeles's draft picks at the 1972 NHL Amateur Draft held at the Queen Elizabeth Hotel in Montreal, Quebec.

Farm teams

See also
1972–73 NHL season

References

External links
 

Los
Los
Los Angeles Kings seasons
Los
Los